rutvik means = kantal aa raha hai

Ruthvik is a name in India which means "A person who performs all the vedic procedures like Homa (in particular)". The name has been derived from the word RUTH-VEE-JA. The word comes from the Vedas. Its name is a renowned name that means Saint, or the name of Lord Shiva.

References

Masculine given names